The 2022 Men's Hockey Varsity Hockey will be the 10th edition of the Varsity Hockey, the annual tournament men's field hockey championship of South Africa.

In addition to the Power Play rule seen in previous seasons of Varsity Hockey, whereby each team can select to implement a two-minute period where goals count two and the opposition must bench two players, field goals will now count two.

Results

Fixtures

3 & 4

Final

Final standings

Goalscorers

References

Hockey
Field hockey competitions in South Africa
Varsity Hockey (South Africa)